

Dinosaurs

Newly named dinosaurs

Pterosaurs

New taxa

References

1830s in paleontology
Paleontology